The following are the lists of Hong Kong Top Footballers, an annual award in Hong Kong football. The award is given to the eleven best players to have featured in that season's top association football division in Hong Kong (the Hong Kong First Division League until 2014 and from then on the Hong Kong Premier League).

Winners

1990–91

1991–92

1992–93

1993–94

1994–95

1995–96

1996–97

1997–98

1998–99

1999–2000

2000–01

2001–02

2002–03

2003–04

2004–05

2005–06

2006–07

2007–08

2008–09

2009–10

2010–11

2011–12

2012–13

2013–14

2014–15

2015–16

2016–17

2017–18

2018–19

2019–20
Cancelled Due to COVID-19

2020–21

See also
 Hong Kong Top Footballer Awards

References

 
Association football player non-biographical articles